Depot Hill is a suburb of Rockhampton in the Rockhampton Region, Queensland, Australia.

Geography 
Depot Hill is situated about one kilometre south of the Rockhampton central business district.  It is considered a low socioeconomic area. It also suffers extensively from flooding due to its proximity to the Fitzroy River and its height above sea level.

The North Coast railway line passes through the suburb from the south-west to the north-west with access to the Rockhampton Railway Workshops in the north of the suburb.

History 
Depot Hill State School opened on 14 September 1920.

In 1932 the Wood Street Baptist Church opened at 10 Wood Street.

On 13 March 1949 the Mary Immaculate Catholic Church was officially opened and blessed by Bishop Andrew Gerard Tynan. The church building had originally been the Catholic church at Westwood, but it was relocated to 81 Wood Street in Depot Hill. The church has now closed and passed into private ownership.

Heritage listings
Depot Hill has a number of heritage-listed sites, including:
 380 Bolsover Street: Rockhampton Railway Workshops

Education 
Depot Hill State School is a government primary (Prep-6) school for boys and girls at O'Connell Street. In 2017, the school had an enrolment of 47 students with 4 teachers and 7 non-teaching staff (4 full-time equivalent).

In 2020 the school was expected to mark its 100th anniversary with special centenary celebrations but due to the COVID-19 pandemic, the festivities were postponed to 2021. A special weekend of festivities commenced on 17 September 2021 with a special dinner at a hotel in Allenstown.  Celebrations at the school were held the following day which included market stalls, memorabilia displays, classroom tours and a special roll call of former students.  Local state MP Barry O'Rourke also officially opened the school's new multipurpose court.

In 2021, the school had an enrolment of 58 students.

There is no secondary school in Depot Hill; the nearest state high school is Rockhampton State High School in Wandal.  The nearest private secondary school is The Cathedral College in Allenstown.

References

Further reading

External links
 

Suburbs of Rockhampton